Robert Travis may refer to:

 Robert F. Travis (1904–1950), U.S. Air Force officer
 Robert S. Travis (1909–1980), Wisconsin politician
 Robert S. Travis Jr. (born 1947), American politician